Sopoaga is a surname. Notable people with the surname include:

 Enele Sopoaga (born 1956), Tuvaluan diplomat and politician
 Fa’afetai Sopoaga, Samoan-New Zealand Pacific public health researcher
 Isaac Sopoaga (born 1981), Samoan-born American football player
 Lima Sopoaga (born 1991), rugby union player
 Saufatu Sopoanga (1952–2020), Tuvaluan politician
 Tupou Sopoaga (born 1992), New Zealand professional rugby union player

See also 
 Sopoaga Ministry